Saladero is a basic industry that produces salted meat such as charqui. It was one of the earliest industries of Argentina and Uruguay after the Argentine War of Independence, benefiting from the availability of cattle in the Humid Pampas and the low technology and manpower requirements. Most of the production was sold to Cuba and Brazil to feed slaves. In time, it expanded into other areas, such as extracting the leather, horns and fat from cows (fat was useful for public lighting, soaps and candles). Saladero declined at the end of the 19th century, with the lowering numbers of foreign slaves (and thus the smaller demand for food for them) and the expansion of refrigeration techniques.

See also
 Hacienda

Meat industry
Economic history of Argentina
Economic history of Uruguay